Surapur Theh  is a village in Shaheed Bhagat Singh Nagar district of Punjab State, India. The village is administrated by Sarpanch an elected representative of the village.

Demography 
As of 2011, Surapur Theh has a total number of 14 houses and population of 71 of which 39 include are males while 32 are females according to the report published by Census India in 2011. The literacy rate of Surapur Theh is 74.24% lower than the state average of 75.84%. The population of children under the age of 6 years is 5 which is 7.04% of total population of Surapur Theh, and child sex ratio is approximately 1500 as compared to Punjab state average of 846.

As per the report published by Census India in 2011, 23 people were engaged in work activities out of the total population of Surapur Theh which includes 23 males and 0 females. According to census survey report 2011, 100% workers describe their work as main work and 0% workers are involved in Marginal activity providing livelihood for less than 6 months.

Education 
Amardeep Singh Shergill Memorial college Mukandpur are the nearest colleges.

List of schools nearby:
Punjabi medium, co-ed upper primary school, Bharo Mazara
Punjabi medium, girls only upper primary with secondary school, Khan Khana
Punjabi medium, boys-only primary school, Khan Khana
Punjabi medium, co-ed primary school, Gosal
Punjabi medium, co-ed alimentary school, Mazara Nauabad

Transport 

See also 
List of villages in India

References

External links 
 Tourism of Punjab
 Census of Punjab
 Locality Based PINCode

Villages in Shaheed Bhagat Singh Nagar district